Nairi Cinema ( (Nairi kinotatron)), is the second-largest cinema hall in the Armenian capital of Yerevan, located on the intersection of Mashtots Avenue with the Isahakyan street at the central Kentron District.  

Opened in 1920, Nairi Cinema is the oldest movie theatre in Yerevan. The original building was located on Amiryan street until the 1950s when it was moved to the current building on Mahstots Avenue. The first ever produced Soviet-Armenian movie Zaré was shown in the cinema in 1926.

The current building of the cinema was constructed between 1952 and 1954 and consists of two halls. It was designed by architect Alexander Tamanian.

References

Cinemas and movie theaters in Armenia
Theatres in Armenia
Movie palaces
Event venues established in 1920
Buildings and structures completed in 1954
Buildings and structures in Yerevan